Maksym Ivanovych Chaus (born 13 January 1994) is a Ukrainian footballer who plays as a striker.

Career
Chaus was born Chernihiv. He started his youth career with Desna Chernihiv and Olimpik Donetsk. In 2014, he moved to Polissya Dobryanka, LKT-Slavutich Chernihiv, Yunist Polissya Dobryanka and Avangard Korukivka across the Ukrainian lower divisions.

Polissya Zhytomyr
In 2017 Chaus signed for FC Polissya Zhytomyr in the Ukrainian Second League. On 31 July, he made his debut against Prykarpattia Ivano-Frankivsk.

Krystal Kherson
In summer 2018 Chaus moved to Kherson in the Ukrainian Second League. He made his debut against MFC Mykolaiv-2 on 22 July.

Chernihiv 
In summer 2020, Chaus moved to FC Chernihiv, which has just been promoted to the Ukrainian Second League. On 24 October, he made his debut against Rubikon Kyiv. On 18 August 2021 he played in the 2021–22 Ukrainian Cup against Chaika Petropavlivska Borshchahivka, helping Chernihiv qualify for the third preliminary round for the first time in club history. On 2 September 2022, he terminated his contract with the club by mutual agreement.

Personal life
His father Ivan Chaus was the president of Desna Chernihiv from 1999 to 2007, the longest serving president in the history of the club.

Honours
Kherson
 Ukrainian Second League: 2019–20

References

External links
 Maksym Chaus at FC Chernihiv 
 
 
 

1993 births
Living people
Ukrainian footballers
Footballers from Chernihiv
Association football forwards
FC Desna Chernihiv players
FC Olimpik Donetsk players
FC Avanhard Koriukivka players
FC Yednist Plysky players
FC Polissya Zhytomyr players
FC Krystal Kherson players
FC Chernihiv players
Ukrainian Second League players
Ukrainian Amateur Football Championship players